Pilapani Parbat (Hindi:पीलापानी पर्वत) is a mountain of the Garhwal Himalaya in Uttarakhand India. It is 33rd highest located entirely within Uttarakhand. Nanda Devi is the highest mountain in this category, and 488th highest in the world. Pilapani Parbat lies between the Sri Kailash and Mana Parbat III . Its nearest higher neighbor Sri Kailash lies 6.5 km NNW. It is located 9.5 km SE of Yogeshwar  and 11.7 km SW lies Bhagirathi Parbat II .

Glacier and river
Pilapani Parbat lies at Pilapani Bamak at the head of Raktvarn glacier on the true left. 

Other glaciers near by:

Nilapani Bamak, Arwa Bamak, Mana Bamak, Kalindi Bamak, Swetvarn Bamak, Gulligad Bamak, and Gangotri Glacier from there emerges the Bhagirathi river, one of the main tributaries of river Ganga. Raktvarn Bamak drains itself near Gomukh beside Gangotri Glacier and part of Bhagirathi river.

Neighboring peaks

Neighboring peaks of Pilapani Parbat:

 Chirbas Parbat 
 Matri 
 Sudarshan Parbat 
 Sri Kailash
 Yogeshwar: 
 Mana Parbat II: 
 Kalindi peak: 
 Chandra Parbat I:

See also

 List of Himalayan peaks of Uttarakhand

References

Mountains of Uttarakhand
Six-thousanders of the Himalayas
Geography of Chamoli district